The Rowdies Cup is a traveling trophy awarded to the winner of the annual college soccer derby between the University of South Florida Bulls and the University of Tampa Spartans, two NCAA men's programs based in the city of Tampa, Florida. The rivalry was known as the Mayor's Cup from 1979 to 2005.

History
The rivalry was first contested on November 5, 1972. USF won the match, 9–2. That meeting happens to have the greatest margin of victory in the series among games played during the regular season. The following year in a preseason exhibition, USF, who had been in training for over three weeks, overwhelmed the out-of-shape Spartans in the September heat by a count of 21–0. UT would finally taste victory for the first time four years later in a 1977 preseason match, by the score of 3–2.

USF has been a Division I program for all but the first meeting between the two schools, while UT has competed at the Division II level for their entire history. In the early years from 1972 to 1997 all but three of the twenty-two meetings were played during the two schools' regular season, but since the rivalry's renewal in 2005 all of the matches have been part of their preseason exhibition schedules. As of the 2022 edition, USF holds a 25–11–3 edge in the all-time series.

The name "Rowdies Cup" was first used at the 2005 meeting. It comes from the first professional sports franchise in the region, the Tampa Bay Rowdies, whose alumni were celebrating the 30th anniversary of their championship victory in Soccer Bowl '75 on August 24, 1975, with a day-long soccer festival held on August 20, 2005. The Bulls-Spartans exhibition match was the final event of the day and has been played every August ever since, aside from 2020 when the game was canceled due to the COVID-19 pandemic.

In 2011, USF opened the new Corbett Stadium, named after former Rowdies owners and USF alumni Dick and Cornelia Corbett.

Trophy
The winner of the annual match is awarded a traveling trophy and has the honor of hoisting the Soccer Bowl '75 trophy, though the Soccer Bowl trophy remains on permanent display at Corbett Stadium no matter who wins the annual game. The current Rowdies Cup trophy is the second edition of the rivalry trophy. The current one, used since the series was renamed to the Rowdies Cup, is a golden circle with the Rowdies wordmark and a soccer ball inside, while the original was more in the style of a traditional soccer trophy (a large golden cup with a wooden base).

Results 

Sources:

References 

Sports in Tampa, Florida
College soccer rivalries in the United States
College soccer rivalry trophies in the United States
1972 establishments in Florida
Recurring sporting events established in 1972
South Florida Bulls men's soccer
Sports rivalries in Florida
Tampa Spartans men's soccer